Cassiani is an Italian surname. Notable people with the surname include:

 (1712-1778), Italian poet
Stefano Cassiani, Italian Baroque painter
Francisco Cassiani (born 1968), Colombian footballer
Geovanis Cassiani (born 1970), Colombian footballer 
Edwin Cassiani (born 1972), Colombian boxer
Edgar Cassiani Perez (born 1981), Colombian footballer

See also 
Cassiano (disambiguation)

Italian-language surnames

fr:Cassiani
it:Cassiani